The Preston to Liverpool is a railway route in the United Kingdom.
From Preston railway station, the route is approximately 57 minutes long when on time. Using the route via Newton-le-Willows will take 1 hour and 9 minutes.

Services
The route has a daily hourly service in each direction with 2 trains per hour in the peaks.

The route is used to the whole route by Northern under the brand of Northern Electrics. Northern uses Class 319s. They will run the Liverpool Lime Street to Blackpool North railway station once the completion of the electrification on the Preston to Blackpool line in 2017.

Stations
Stations on route:
Preston railway station
Leyland railway station
Euxton Balshaw Lane railway station
†Wigan North Western railway station
†St Helens Central railway station
†Huyton railway station
†Liverpool Lime Street railway station

† – Northern Electrics operate two lines between Wigan and Liverpool; however, this is the express route which continues to Preston while the other route terminates at Wigan. See Liverpool–Wigan line.

See also
West Coast Main Line

References

Rail transport in Liverpool
Rail transport in Merseyside
Rail transport in Greater Manchester
Rail transport in Lancashire
Railway lines in North West England